Love Actually... Sucks! is a 2011 Hong Kong movie, directed by Hong Kong Chinese film producer Scud (Danny Cheng Wan-Cheung 云翔). The film's title is a humorous wordplay on the romantic comedy film Love Actually, as it deals with similar complicated and interconnected relationships. It was released at the 47th Chicago International Film Festival, in October 2011. It explores several themes traditionally regarded as 'taboo' in Hong Kong society, in an unusually open, convention-defying way, featuring frequent full-frontal male and female nudity. It is the fourth of seven publicly released films by Scud.The six other films are: City Without Baseball in 2008, Permanent Residence in 2009, Amphetamine in 2010, Voyage in 2013, Utopians in 2015 and Thirty Years of Adonis in 2017. The eighth film, Apostles, was made in 2022, as was the ninth, Bodyshop, but neither have yet been released. The tenth and final film, Naked Nations: Hong Kong Tribe, is currently in production.

Plot
Love Actually... Sucks! was inspired by real-life events, and opens with a dramatic wedding feast. It tells a variety of stories about love that has gone wrong: a brother and sister in an illicit relationship, a married painter who falls in love with his young male life model, a dance school teacher who becomes involved with his senior student, a role-playing lesbian couple, and a complex love triangle. The film celebrates the belief that life is love.

Cast

Production
A memorable scene in the movie shows a woman performing oral sex on her boyfriend. Scud confirmed the act was unsimulated. "Linda So was at first concerned if she was going to be able to do it. The scene took five takes to film, and Haze Leung quipped, 'One more take and I would have come.' When we where done, Linda and Haze collapsed in laughter. They are real professionals," Scud said."

Home media
A Panorama Distribution edition of Love Actually... Sucks! was released internationally on VCD, DVD and Blu-ray Disc on 26 June 2012.

See also
 Hong Kong films of 2011
 List of lesbian, gay, bisexual or transgender-related films
 List of lesbian, gay, bisexual, or transgender-related films by storyline
 Nudity in film (East Asian cinema since 1929)

References

External links
 
 
 
 Love Actually... Sucks! at LoveHKFilm.com

2011 films
Chinese independent films
Chinese-language films
Chinese LGBT-related films
Hong Kong independent films
2010s Cantonese-language films
English-language Hong Kong films
English-language Chinese films
Films directed by Scud (filmmaker)
Films set in Hong Kong
Gay-related films
Hong Kong LGBT-related films
LGBT-related drama films
Male bisexuality in film
Erotic drama films
2011 drama films
2011 LGBT-related films
2010s Hong Kong films